The Loloish languages, also known as Yi and occasionally Ngwi or Nisoic, are a family of fifty to a hundred Sino-Tibetan languages spoken primarily in the Yunnan province of China. They are most closely related to Burmese and its relatives. Both the Loloish and Burmish branches are well defined, as is their superior node, Lolo-Burmese. However, subclassification is more contentious.

SIL Ethnologue (2013 edition) estimated a total number of 9 million native speakers of Ngwi languages, the largest group being the speakers of Nuosu (Northern Yi) at 2 million speakers (2000 PRC census).

Names
Loloish is the traditional name for the family. Some publications avoid the term under the misapprehension that Lolo is pejorative, but it is the Chinese rendition of the autonym of the Yi people and is pejorative only when it is written with a particular Chinese character (one that uses a beast, rather than a human, radical), a practice that was prohibited by the Chinese government in the 1950s.

David Bradley uses the name Ngwi, which is also used by Ethnologue, and Lama (2012) uses Nisoic. Paul K. Benedict coined the term Yipho, from Yi and a common autonym element (-po or -pho), but it never gained wide usage.

Internal classification

Bradley (2007)
Loloish was traditionally divided into a northern branch, with Lisu and the numerous Yi languages and a southern branch, with everything else. However, per Bradley and Thurgood there is also a central branch, with languages from both northern and southern. Bradley adds a fourth, southeastern branch.

Northern Loloish: Nuosu (2 million), Nasu (1.0 million), etc.
Central Loloish: Lisu (940,000)–Lipho (250,000) (incl. Lolopo (570,000), Lalo (320,000)), Micha (50,000), Lahu (600,000), Jinuo (21,000), etc.
Southern Loloish: Akha–Hani, Phunoi–Bisu, Pholo and ’Ugong (aberrant; removed in Bradley 1997)
Southeastern Loloish: Nisu, Phula, Sani, Azha, Khlula, Muji, Phowa, etc.

Ugong is divergent; Bradley (1997) places it with the Burmish languages. The Tujia language is difficult to classify due to divergent vocabulary. Other unclassified Loloish languages are Gokhy (Gɔkhý), Lopi and Ache.

Lama (2012)
Lama (2012) classified 36 Lolo–Burmese languages based on a computational analysis of shared phonological and lexical innovations. He finds the Mondzish languages to be a separate branch of Lolo-Burmese, which Lama considers to have split off before Burmish did. The rest of the Loloish languages are as follows:

The Nisoish, Lisoish, and Kazhuoish clusters are closely related, forming a clade ("Ni-Li-Ka") at about the same level as the other five branches of Loloish. Lama's Naxish clade has been classified as Qiangic rather than Loloish by Guillaume Jacques and Alexis Michaud (see Qiangic languages).

A Lawoish (Lawu) branch has also been recently proposed.

Satterthwaite-Phillips' (2011) computational phylogenetic analysis of the Lolo-Burmese languages does support the inclusion of Naxish (Naic) within Lolo-Burmese, but recognizes Lahoish and Nusoish as coherent language groups that form independent branches of Loloish.

Lesser-known languages

Notes

References

 
Lolo-Burmese languages
Languages of Myanmar
Languages of China